Buena Mano Balita  is a Philippine television news broadcasting program broadcast by GMA Cebu. It premiered on October 8, 2007. The newscast concluded on April 24, 2015.

Overview
It is composed of various fun and informative segments that will arm the viewers with information and trivia which will help them make the “right” choices for the day. It is set to jumpstart Cebu mornings with just the right dose of news, weather update, entertainment news  and information. Buena Mano Balita is currently the no.1 morning entertainment and news show, gathering a TV Rating of 12.5% this September 2012. While its competitor in ABS-CBN only received 5.8%.

Without saying goodbyes, it had their final broadcast for more than 7 years last April 24, 2015, as part of the streamlining of regional operations of GMA after the broadcast, the hosts and the on-air staff of BMB were retrenched by the network's management.

GMA Cebu would not have a regional morning newscast until 5 years later, with the launch of GMA Regional TV Live! on April 20, 2020.

Final hosts
Alan Domingo
Yuri Deldig 
Cheryl Pelayo-Dacua 
Bobby Nalzaro
Mark Anthony Bautista
Fr. Dan delos Angeles

References 

GMA Network news shows
GMA Integrated News and Public Affairs shows
Philippine television news shows
2007 Philippine television series debuts
2015 Philippine television series endings
Television in Cebu City